Other Folks' Music is an album by the jazz multi-instrumentalist Rahsaan Roland Kirk, recorded in March 1976. It contains performances by Kirk with 
Richard Williams, Kermit Moore, Gloria Agostini, Trudy Pitts, Hilton Ruiz, Henry Mattathias Pearson, Roy Haynes, Sonny Brown, Arthur Jenkins and Joseph "Habao" Texidor.

Reception
The AllMusic review by Thom Jurek states: "Other Folks' Music is perhaps his most dizzying and troubling recording. Meant to be both a tribute and a pointer for the next move in modern black music, Other Folks' Music is, when all is said and done, a very private altar adorned with much of Kirk's personal iconography... in all of Kirk's moods and segues, his usually indelible mark of inseparability — the trace that says that this is all one music and we are all one people — is missing here, and the listener can feel the separation between tracks, and sometimes inside the tracks themselves. The music is still topnotch, but that nagging ghost of isolation on Other Folks' Music can still haunt the listener".

Track listing
 "Water for Robeson and Williams" (Rahsaan Roland Kirk) - 3:48  
 "That's All" (Alan Brandt, Bob Haymes) - 7:39  
 "Donna Lee" (Charlie Parker) - 4:10  
 "Simone" (Frank Foster) - 9:05  
 "Anysha" (Trudy Pitts) - 8:13  
 "Samba Kwa Mwanamke Mweusi" (Henry Mattathias Pearson) - 6:53  
 "Arrival" (Hilton Ruiz) - 7:09  
Recorded at Regent Sound Studios, NYC, March, 1975

Personnel
Roland Kirk: tenor saxophone, manzello, stritch, clarinet, flute, reed trumpet, harmonica, miscellaneous instruments, arranger 
Richard Williams: trumpet
Kermit Moore: cello
Gloria Agostini: harp
Trudy Pitts: piano, electric piano, arranger
Hilton Ruiz: piano arranger
Henry Mattathias Pearson: bass, arranger
Roy Haynes: drums
Sonny Brown: drums
Arthur Jenkins, Joseph "Habao" Texidor: percussion

References

1976 albums
Atlantic Records albums
Rahsaan Roland Kirk albums
Albums produced by Joel Dorn